Arbasy Duże  is a village in the administrative district of Gmina Drohiczyn, within Siemiatycze County, Podlaskie Voivodeship, in north-eastern Poland.

The village has a population of 150.

Monuments 
 Baroque wayside shrine.

References

Villages in Siemiatycze County